Encephalous Crime is the first album by trance fusion band The Disco Biscuits. It was self-released in 1996.

Track listing
"Mr. Don" - 6:17 (Gutwillig)
"Rainbow Song" - 3:35 (Brownstein)
"Stone" - 3:32 (Gutwillig, Matt O'Brien)
"The Devil's Waltz" - 4:34 (Gutwillig)
"El Camino del Gordissimo (S.O.B.P. Interlude)" - :24 (Altman)
"Radiator" - 5:41 (Brownstein)
"Trooper McCue" - 5:13 (Brownstein)
"Pat and Dex" - 8:11 (Brownstein, Gutwillig, Ben Hayflick)
"Barfly" - 4:44 (Gutwillig, A. Braff)
"Pygmy Twylyte" (Live 08-07-96) - 7:00 (Frank Zappa)
"Basis for a Day" (Live 08-07-96) - 14:51 (Gutwillig, Kevin Abrams)

Personnel
 Jon Gutwillig – Guitar
 Marc Brownstein – Bass
 Sam Altman – Drums
 Aron Magner – Keyboards

References

1996 albums
Disco Biscuits albums